August 19 – Eastern Orthodox liturgical calendar – August 21

All fixed commemorations below are observed on September 2 by Orthodox Churches on the Old Calendar.

For August 20, Orthodox Churches on the Old Calendar commemorate the Saints listed on August 7.

Feasts

 Afterfeast of the Dormition.

Saints

 Prophet Samuel (11th century BC)
 Hieromartyr Philip of Heraclea, Bishop, and with him Martyrs Severus, Memnon, and 37 soldiers, in Philippopolis, Thrace (304)
 Saints Reginus and Orestes the Great Martyrs, in Cyprus.
 Martyr Lucius the Senator, of Cyprus (c. 310)
 Martyrs Heliodorus and Dosa (Dausa) in Persia (380)
 Martyr Photine, at the gates of Blachernae.
 Saint Hierotheus, first Bishop and Enlightener of Hungary (10th century)
 Saint Stephen I of Hungary, King of Hungary (1038)  (see also: August 16 - West)

Pre-Schism Western saints

 Saint Porphyrius, an early martyr in Palestrina near Rome.
 Saint Amator (Amadour), hermit.
 Saint Maximus, a disciple of St Martin and founder of the monastery of Chinon in France, confessor (c. 470)
 Martyr Oswine of Deira, king of Deira (651)
 Saint Haduin (Harduin), Bishop of Le Mans in France, he founded several monasteries including Notre-Dame-d'Evron (c. 662)
 Saint Philibert of Jumièges (Gaul) (685)
 Saint Eadberht of Northumbria (Edbert), successor of St Ceolwulf on the throne of Northumbria in England, then became a monastic (768) 
 Saint Burchard, monk at Lobbes Abbey in Belgium, then became Bishop of Worms where he was a canonist (1026)

Post-Schism Orthodox saints

 Venerable Abramius of Smolensk, Archimandrite, Wonderworker of Smolensk, (1220)  (see also: August 21)
 New Martyr Theocharis of Neapolis, Cappadocia (1740)

New martyrs and confessors

 New Hieromartyr Vladimir Chetverin, Priest (1938)
 New Martyrs of Estonia (1944-1955):
 New Hieromartyr Peeter (Pähkel), Bishop of Tartu and Pechory (1948)
 New Hieromartyr Alypy (Ivlev), Archimandrite (1950)
 New Hieromartyr Vladimir Irodionov, Protopresbyter (1945)
 New Hieromartyr Ioann Vark, Priest (1952)
 New Hieromartyr Leonid Lavrov, Priest (1954)
 New Hieromartyr Seraphim Ulyanov, Priest (1955)
 Martyr Alexander Gadalin, church warden (1951)
 Martyr Andrei Punsun (1955)

Other commemorations

 Repose of Hieromonk Seraphim Rose of Platina, California (1982)
 Repose of Archimandrite Spyridon (Lukich) of Kyiv (1991)

Icon gallery

Notes

References

Sources
 August 20 / September 2. Orthodox Calendar (PRAVOSLAVIE.RU).
 September 2 / August 20. Holy Trinity Russian Orthodox Church (A parish of the Patriarchate of Moscow).
 August 20. OCA - The Lives of the Saints.
 The Autonomous Orthodox Metropolia of Western Europe and the Americas (ROCOR). St. Hilarion Calendar of Saints for the year of our Lord 2004. St. Hilarion Press (Austin, TX). p. 61.
 Menologion: The Twentieth Day of the Month of August. Orthodoxy in China.
 Archimandrite Nektarios Serfes. New Martyred Soldiers For Christ Our Lord. January 20, 2004.
 August 20. Latin Saints of the Orthodox Patriarchate of Rome.
 The Roman Martyrology. Transl. by the Archbishop of Baltimore. Last Edition, According to the Copy Printed at Rome in 1914. Revised Edition, with the Imprimatur of His Eminence Cardinal Gibbons. Baltimore: John Murphy Company, 1916. pp. 250–251.
 Rev. Richard Stanton. A Menology of England and Wales, or, Brief Memorials of the Ancient British and English Saints Arranged According to the Calendar, Together with the Martyrs of the 16th and 17th Centuries. London: Burns & Oates, 1892. pp. 401–403.

 Greek Sources
 Great Synaxaristes:  20 ΑΥΓΟΥΣΤΟΥ. ΜΕΓΑΣ ΣΥΝΑΞΑΡΙΣΤΗΣ.
  Συναξαριστής. 20 Αυγούστου. ECCLESIA.GR. (H ΕΚΚΛΗΣΙΑ ΤΗΣ ΕΛΛΑΔΟΣ).

 Russian Sources
  2 сентября (20 августа). Православная Энциклопедия под редакцией Патриарха Московского и всея Руси Кирилла (электронная версия). (Orthodox Encyclopedia - Pravenc.ru).

August in the Eastern Orthodox calendar